Leda Catunda Serra, known as Leda Catunda (born 1961) is a Brazilian painter, sculptor, graphic artist and educator. She is a representative name of the Geração 80 artists' group. Her works explore the limits of textures and materials, being characterized by her "soft paintings" over towels, bedclothes, leather, velvet and silk.

Biography
Catunda was born in 1961 in São Paulo. She studied Visual Arts  at Fundação Armando Álvares Penteado (FAAP). Before becoming an artist, she wanted to be a rock musician. Early in her career she was featured in a group exhibition called "Pintura como meio," held at the Museu de Arte Contemporanea da Universidade de Sao Paulo in 1983. Catunda  gained recognition when she exposed her works at the exhibition Como vai você, Geração 80?, (How are you, Generation 80?) held in 1984 at Escola de Artes Visuais do Parque Lage, in Rio de Janeiro. After this exhibition she became something of a national celebrity, appearing on the covers of magazines and newspapers. She taught Graphical Arts  at FAAP from 1986 to mid 1990s and became Doctor in Visual Arts at University of São Paulo in 2001 Catunda participated of three São Paulo Biennials (1983,1985 and 1994) and several individual exhibitions.

References

External links 
 

1961 births
Living people
Brazilian women painters
Brazilian women sculptors
20th-century Brazilian painters
20th-century Brazilian sculptors
20th-century Brazilian women artists
21st-century Brazilian painters
21st-century Brazilian sculptors
21st-century Brazilian women artists
People from São Paulo